Tirumakudalu Narasipura  (Tirumakūḍalu Narasīpura) the temple city of Karnataka, commonly known as T. Narasipura or T.N. Pura, is a town in Mysore district in the Indian state of Karnataka. The first name refers to the land at the confluence, (trimakuta in Sanskrit at the confluence of the Kaveri, Kabini and Spatika Sarovara (a mythical lake or spring, also named Gupta Gamini).

This is the place in South India where Kumbhamela is held every three years. It finds a mention in the Skanda Purana as one of the Trimakuta Kshetras (holy places at the confluence of three rivers). The word 'Narasipura' is the name of the town, which is derived from the famous Gunja Narasimhaswamy temple that is located on the right bank of the Kabini (Kapila) river. Considered as sacred as Prayag (confluence of the Ganges, the Yamuna and the Saraswati at Prayag – Varanasi - Kashi in North India), it is also known as Dakshina Kashi The town finds mention in tourism guides, both as a tourist place and a pilgrimage centre.

Archeological Significance 
T. Narasipura and its surrounding areas are prehistoric sites where many Neolithic sites have been unearthed by the Department of Archeology and Museums of Karnataka. The rich and fertile areas of the taluka cultivated by the Kaveri and its tributaries, has been the source of continued uninhibited human habitation, over the centuries, as verified by the ancient archeological evidences discovered in the area. The ancient sites excavated in the late fifties and up to mid-sixties (between 1959 and 1965) on the left bank of the Kaveri near the Bhiksheswara Temple, opposite to Narasipura town, which form part of the Upper Kaveri basin, has established the Neolithic phase in the region claiming a date from the first half of second millennium BC which saw the gradual evolution of the peasants into food producing and settled communities responsible for the growth of civilization. The systematic ground excavations comprising burial ground remnants, potteries, graffiti, stone implements, metal objects, beads and bangles, animal remains, human remains, wood remains, etc. examined in depth and in great detail have revealed four cultural phases at the sites, but the most outstanding phase has been deduced as the Neolithic phase.

An authoritative report on the "Excavations at T.Narasipur" by Prof M.Seshadri, Director of Archeology of Mysore published in 1971 provides a detailed insight into the ancient pre-historic civilizational bearings of T. Narasipura town and its surroundings.

Demographics
 India census, Tirumakudalu Narasipura town had a population of 9,930. Males constitute 50% of the population and females 50%. It has an average literacy rate of 66%, higher than the national average of 59.5%: male literacy is 73%, and female literacy is 59%. 11% of the population is under 6 years of age.

Access 

Tirumakudalu Narasipura town is the headquarters of the Tirumakudalu Narasipura taluk of the same name (with a 2001 Census population of 279,005) within Mysore District. It is 29 km south-east of Mysore, the district headquarters and 130 km from Bangalore, the state capital. The town is well connected with roads, NH 212 bypasses the town, SH79, SH84 will pass inside the town. It is reachable by buses very easily, every 5 mins private buses departures from Mysuru RMC bus stand, hourly bus from Bengaluru Kalasipalya bus stand.  Nearest airport is Mysore Airport. Mysore Junction Railway Station and Nanjangud Town Railway Station are the nearest railheads.

Temples
It is a place of religious prominence. The Gunja Narasimha Swamy temple on the right bank of the Kaveri river, is a massive complex belonging to the Vijayanagara period. The image of Narasimha in the sanctum sanctorum has a weighing balance with a twig with seed of the Gunja (botanical name-Abrus precatorius) tree and hence is called Gunja Narasimha Swamy. It signifies the importance of the temple vis-a-vis the Kasi pilgrimage center by a measure of the  seedgulaganji. It has inscriptions dating from the Krishnadevaraya period with a mélange of Dravidian and Hoysala Architecture and is renowned for the voluminous records in Nagari script. The Mahakumbhaabhishekam or re-consecration rites of the renovated temple was performed by the donor and his family members from 5 to 9 March 2011.

Pancha lingas of T Narasipura region: Agasthyeshwara temple is another famous ancient temple in the town, predating Gunja Narasimha Swamy temple. (Agastya founded and sanctified the Agasthyeshwara temple. This temple complex contains many monuments belonging to the Ganga, Chola, Hoysala and Vijayanagara periods at Thirumakudlu, and also at the Bhiksheswara temple, the Moolasthaneshwara temple and the Anandeswara temple in the surrounding area. 
It is said that Tirumakudalu is where Rishi Agasthya had visualised it as 'Dakshina Kashi' long ago. When he travelled down south to Narsipur, the town was a thick forest. Enamoured by the confluence of the three rivers - Kaveri, Kapila and the undercurrent of Spatika Sarovara - he wanted to install a Shiva Linga there and asked Hanuman to get him a linga from Kashi. Since the auspicious period lasting three-and-a-three-fourths of a galige was fast approaching and Hanuman failed to get the linga on time, the sage created a sand linga himself and consecrated it. An insulted Hanuman, who returned soon, cut off the top portion of the sand linga consecrated by Agasthya. Ever since this incident a perennial presence of water which is believed to be the water of Ganga can be found in the axed summit of the linga, and the same is offered as thirtha (holy water) to the pilgrims. The linga that Hanuman brought was consecrated a little distance away and is called the Hanuman Linga. The Someshwara and Markandeshwara lingams in T Narsipur and the Gargeshwara Lingam at Gargeshwari village, along with the Agasthyeshwara and the Hanuman lingam, form the panchalingas of T Narsipur, just like the five lingams at Talakad.

Sosale is a small village near T.Narsipur. Sosale is located on the left bank of the Cauvery River near its confluence with the Kabini River, about 3 km away from the Agastheswara Temple at Tirumakudlu. Sosale Devasthana is a beautiful temple in the village.  The temple is breathtakingly beautiful and is located in the middle of vast expanses of paddy fields.  There are white domes on the back of the temple which is a kind ancient worship ritual of the locals.

Religious festivals
The chariot festivals of Gunja Narasimha Swamy and Agastheswara, conducted every year, are attended by Lakhs of people.

Samgama festival in Tirumakudalu every year on the day of Yugadi festival. Lakhs of people visit the fest and take holy dip in the confluence of Kaveri, Kapila and Spatika Sarovara.

The Kumbha Mela of T. Narasipura, of recent origin, since 1989, is an event that occurs once in three years.
Organised by the Kumbha Mela Trust under the auspices of senior pontiffs and religious leaders of the State. The congregation is meant to underline the concept of unity in diversity. The Kumbha Mela of Allahabad and Nasik is replicated at T. Narasipura when lakhs of devotees assemble and take a holy dip in the confluence of three rivers. A slice of ancient India unfolds as ochre-clad sadhus join people to take a dip at the confluence of the Kaveri, the Kabini, and the celestial lake "Spatika Sarovara".

Notable people

 Chowdiah - Carnatic violin maestro
 Vatal Nagaraj - member of Karnataka Legislative Assembly
 Siddaramaiah - chief minister of Karnataka
Kanaka Murthy - sculptor and author 
S.M. Siddaiah - Former Member of Parliament representing  Chamarajanagar constituency

Gallery

References

External links

Cities and towns in Mysore district